Patrick Shevelle Love (born July 23, 1968) is an American gospel musician. He started his music career with the release of Wait on the Lord, released in 1994, by Crystal Rose Records. His second album, The Vision, was released by Crystal Rose Records in 1998. Both albums charted on the Billboard magazine Gospel Albums charts.

Early life
Love was born in Charlotte, North Carolina, as Patrick Shevelle Love. His father is a retired stevedore; his mother was a small business owner and early childhood educator. Patrick is a 1986 graduate of West Mecklenburg High School.

Music career
Patrick's formal music career began in 1994, with inspiration from Donald Lawrence, who attended his church, Salem Baptist Church. Lawrence helped to foster Love's career by signing him, along with his choir, to the label that he co-owned, Crystal Rose Records. Lawrence helped to produce the two albums that Love released. The 1994 release of Wait on the Lord was Love's breakthrough release on the Billboard magazine Gospel Albums at No. 18. His second album, The Vision, was released on March 10, 1998, and it charted at No. 16 on the aforementioned chart.

Discography

References

1968 births
Living people
African-American songwriters
African-American Christians
Musicians from Charlotte, North Carolina
Songwriters from North Carolina
21st-century African-American people
20th-century African-American people